Siple Coast is the middle portion of the relatively ill-defined coast along the east side of the Ross Ice Shelf, between the north end of Gould Coast and the south end of Shirase Coast. The area was originally called Kirton Coast, but was renamed by NZ-APC in 1961 after Paul A. Siple, a noted American scientist-explorer who accompanied R. Admiral Richard E. Byrd on all of his Antarctic expeditions.

Further reading 
  Bindschadler, R. (1993), Siple Coast Project research of Crary Ice Rise and the mouths of Ice Streams B and C, West Antarctica: Review and new perspectives, Journal of Glaciology, 39(133), 538–552. doi:10.3189/S0022143000016439

External links 

 Siple Coast on USGS website
 Siple Coast on SCAR website
 Siple Coast Ice Velocities
 Satellite image of the Siple Coast

Reference 

Coasts of the Ross Dependency
King Edward VII Land